Latifa Al Megren (also rendered as Latifa Al-Mejren, born April 13, 1957) is a Bahraini actress.

Biography
Her first dramatic role was in the 1973 series Wugooh La Illa, co-starring actors from the Al-Ahsa Governorate in Saudi Arabia’s Saudi Arabia, including Hassan Al-Abdi, Omar Al-Obeidi, and Abdelrahman Al-Hamad. After her career started in earnest in 1989, she became famous for her warm, maternal roles, but she branched out into many others both comic and tragic. She is married to Hammoud Muhammad, and they have five children: Wafaa, Maha, Muhammad, Hamad, and Fawaz.

Career

Television series

Theatre

Film

Variety television
1980 Salamtak

External links
 El Cinema page
 Imdb page

References

1957 births
Bahraini television actresses
Bahraini stage actresses
Bahraini film actresses
Living people